The second season of The Fairly OddParents premiered on December 9, 2001 and ended on January 20, 2003. The season was produced by Frederator Studios and Nickelodeon Animation Studio.

Episodes

(HH) indicates the amount of households an episode was viewed in when it premiered.

DVD releases

References

2002 American television seasons
2003 American television seasons
The Fairly OddParents seasons